The Award of Garden Merit (AGM) is a long-established annual award for plants by the British Royal Horticultural Society (RHS). It is based on assessment of the plants' performance under UK growing conditions.

History
The Award of Garden Merit is a mark of quality awarded, since 1922, to garden plants (including trees, vegetables and decorative plants) by the United Kingdom, Royal Horticultural Society (RHS). Awards are made annually after plant trials intended to judge the plants' performance under UK growing conditions. Trials may last for one or more years, depending on the type of plant being analyzed, and may be performed at Royal Horticulture Society Garden in Wisley and other gardens or after observation of plants in specialist collections. Trial reports are made available as booklets and on the website. Awards are reviewed annually in case plants have become unavailable horticulturally, or have been superseded by better cultivars.

Similar awards
The award should not be confused with the Royal Horticulture Society's Award of Merit (AM), given to plants deemed "of great merit for exhibition" i.e. for show, not garden, plants.

Since 1989, France has had similar awards called the Mérites de Courson, but these are drawn from a limited number of plants submitted by nurserymen to juries at the twice-yearly Journées des Plantes de Courson and awards are based solely on the opinions of the jury members as to the plants' likely performance in French gardens, rather than on extensive trials.

All-America Selections is an independent non-profit organization that tests new, never-before-sold varieties for the home gardener. 

Plants of Merit are plants selected for their outstanding quality and dependable performance for the lower Midwest United States.

Reviews
The Award of Garden Merit was reviewed in 1992, to increase its usefulness and prestige. Field trial results gained weight in the assessments and existing AGM plants were reviewed in the light of more recent experience. The AGMs were to be reviewed at 10 year intervals from 1992, but this frequency has been increased to annually. The 2012/13 review, with advice from experts such as Royal Horticultural Society's plant committees, specialist societies, Plant Heritage National Collection holders and others, resulted in many changes. Nearly 1,900 plants lost their merit awards and more than 1,400 plants gained awards; the list included 7,073 plants after the review.

Rescission
Plants may be added to the Royal Horticultural Society "Sunset List" for rescission for several reasons, including unavailability to gardeners, better plants becoming available, affliction by pests or diseases, or insufficient uniformity.

Criteria
To qualify for an Award of Garden Merit, a plant
 must be available horticulturally
 must be of outstanding excellence for garden decoration or use
 must be of good constitution
 must not require highly specialist growing conditions or care
 must not be particularly susceptible to any pest or disease
 must not be subject to an unreasonable degree of reversion.

The "Award of Garden Merit" symbol represents a cup-shaped trophy with handles. It is cited together with a hardiness rating as follows: 
 H1 Requires a heated glasshouse
 H1a Warmer than 15°C/59F: tropical plants for indoors and heated greenhouses
 H1b 10°C/50F to 15°C/59F: subtropical plants for indoors and heated greenhouses
 H1c 5°C/41F to 10°C/50F: warm temperate plants that can go outdoors in summer
 H2 1°C/34F to 5°C/41F: plants that need a frost-free greenhouse in winter
 H3 −5°C/23F to 1°C/34F: hardy outside in some regions or situations, or which - while usually grown outside in summer - need frost protection in winter (e.g. dahlias) 
 H4 −10°C/14F to −5°C/23F: plants hardy outside in most of the UK in an average winter

 H5 −15°C/5F to −10°C/14F: plants hardy outside in most of the UK in severe winters
 H6 −20°C/−4F to −15°C/5F: plants hardy outside in the UK and northern Europe
 H7 Colder than −20°C/−4F: plants hardy outside in the severest European climates

See also
 List of Award of Garden Merit camellias
 List of Award of Garden Merit clematis
 List of Award of Garden Merit dahlias
 List of Award of Garden Merit dianthus
 List of Award of Garden Merit flowering cherries
 List of Award of Garden Merit magnolias
 List of Award of Garden Merit maples
 List of Award of Garden Merit narcissus
 List of Award of Garden Merit rhododendrons
 List of Award of Garden Merit roses
 List of Award of Garden Merit sweet peas
 List of Award of Garden Merit tulips

References

RHS Plant Finder 2005–2006, Dorling Kindersley (2005)

External links
 The Royal Horticultural Society's website - Search facility for AGM plants
 RHS AGM Plant Awards
 RHS Plant Committees
 Search for AGM plants The Royal Horticultural Society
 Complete AGM lists

Royal Horticultural Society
Gardening in the United Kingdom
Plant awards